Bivallum is a genus of fungi within the Rhytismataceae family. The genus contains six species.

References

External links 

 Bivallum at Index Fungorum

Leotiomycetes